Luke Flintoft (1680 - 3 Nov 1727), was an English clergyman and composer.

Flintoft took the degree of BA at Queens' College, Cambridge, in 1700, and was appointed priest-vicar at Lincoln Cathedral in 1704. He remained there until 1714. On 4 Dec. 1715 he was sworn as a gentleman of the Chapel Royal, and is described in the 'Cheque Book' as 'from Worcester,’ which therefore was probably his birthplace. On 9 July 1719 he was appointed reader in Whitehall Chapel, and was subsequently made a minor canon of Westminster. He died on 3 Nov 1727, and was buried in the cloisters of Westminster Abbey.

Flintoft's Chant

His claim to a place in musical history depends upon the question whether a certain 'double chant' in G minor, attributed to him, is or is not the first specimen of the kind in existence. The arguments for and against this will be found in 'Notes and Queries,’ 3rd ser. x. 206, xi. 267, 391, and 445.

Flintoft's Chant, described as "perhaps the most beautiful chant ever composed".

References

Bibliography

1680 births
1727 deaths
18th-century classical composers
18th-century British male musicians
English Baroque composers
English classical composers
English male classical composers
Gentlemen of the Chapel Royal
Alumni of Queens' College, Cambridge